Michael Hanna is an Irish judge who has been a Judge of the High Court since 2004.

Early life 
Hanna originates from Belfast and was educated at St MacNissi's College. His father was Frank Hanna, a Northern Ireland Labour Party MP. He was educated at Trinity College Dublin and the King's Inns. He is a former auditor of the College Historical Society.

He became a barrister in 1976 and a senior counsel in 1996. Hanna's practice was focused on the Dublin and South-Eastern circuits, where he specialised in personal injury cases and the law of tort. Criminal cases also formed part of his practice.

Judicial career 
Hanna was appointed to the High Court in 2004. He was appointed following recommendation by the Judicial Appointments Advisory Board. He presided over a planning law case involving Van Morrison and his wife Michelle Rocca in 2010. He was the judge in a 2011 case taken by Ryanair against a German ticket sale website, in which he held that ticket scraping was a breach of Ryanair's website terms. This was considered to be the first Irish case involving the enforceability of online terms of service. He often acted as judge at the Court of Criminal Appeal, prior to its disbandment following the establishment of the Court of Appeal.

He frequently hears personal injuries cases in the High Court. He applied a test of "ordinary common sense" to assess evidence in a personal injuries case involving a woman who had slipped in a car park. This test was endorsed in a judgment of Mary Irvine in the Court of Appeal.

Personal life 
He became ill while in Spain in 2014 and was in an induced coma. He was unable to hear cases for a period of time following. Hanna is a singer of opera.

References 

Living people
High Court judges (Ireland)
Alumni of Trinity College Dublin
Alumni of King's Inns
Lawyers from Belfast
Year of birth missing (living people)